Sijo Saabir Quwi Muhammad (born Steve Sanders; July 2, 1939) is an American martial artist and police officer.

Early life 
Sanders was born in Indianola, Mississippi on July 2, 1939.  He was the youngest of several siblings. As a youth, he learned tai chi.  He attended Kansas State University on a Football Scholarship. Sanders joined the Marines, where he was exposed to Gōjū-ryū karate. He served in the Vietnam War while in the Marines. Afterwards, he worked as a security officer for Los Angeles County, California.

Career 
Despite racism during the era, Sanders became a champion fighter. He won many state and national titles. Sanders is said to have had the fastest hands in karate. Sanders earned his black belt from Dan Inosanto and Chuck Sullivan. Sanders faced Chuck Norris and holds wins in Ed Parkers Long Beach Internationals 
. Sanders developed the five speed theory and the 12 basic moves of kenpō. Sanders founded the Black Karate Federation.

In 1982, Sanders joined the Nation of Islam and changed his last name to Muhammad.  He would as a result convert to Islam. Sanders played the instructor of Jim Kelly in Enter the Dragon. Sanders received the Battle of Atlanta Hall of Fame award in 2012.  Sanders was nominated to the Black Belt magazine hall of fame. Sanders holds a 10th degree black belt.  He is the author of Bkf Kenpo: History and Advanced Strategic Principles.  Sanders appeared in the 1982 training video World Of Martial Arts with Benny Urquidez, Chuck Norris and John Saxon. His student Ray Wizard fought in UFC 2.

See also

Racism in martial arts

References

Sources 
 

1939 births
Living people
20th-century African-American sportspeople
21st-century African-American people
African-American United States Navy personnel
African-American police officers
African-American sportsmen
American male karateka
United States Marine Corps personnel of the Vietnam War
Karate coaches
Members of the Nation of Islam
People from Indianola, Mississippi
Shotokan practitioners
Sportspeople from Mississippi
United States Marines
African Americans in the Vietnam War